The following list is the electoral history of Tulsi Gabbard. Tulsi Gabbard previously served as a member of the Hawaii House of Representatives, the Honolulu City Council, and is a former member of the United States House of Representatives.

Hawaii House of Representatives elections (2002)

Honolulu City Council elections (2010)

United States House of Representatives elections

2012

2014

2016

2018

References 

Gabbard, Tulsi
Tulsi Gabbard
Gabbard, Tulsi